A free license or open license grants recipients rights to modify and redistribute the software or the content, which would otherwise be prohibited by copyright law. Examples include:

 Free software license
 Free content license (for example Creative Commons licenses)
Open licence (French)